Mekki Mohsen Tombari born 15 February 2001) is a Qatari footballer who plays as a forward for Al-Kharaitiyat.

References

External links
 

2001 births
Living people
Qatari footballers
Association football forwards
Al-Rayyan SC players
Umm Salal SC players
Al Kharaitiyat SC players
Qatar Stars League players
Qatari Second Division players
Qatar under-20 international footballers
Qatar youth international footballers